

Mathematics
 Chebyshev center
 Chebyshev constants
 Chebyshev cube root
 Chebyshev distance
 Chebyshev equation
 Chebyshev's equioscillation theorem
 Chebyshev filter, a family of analog filters in electronics and signal processing
 Chebyshev function in number theory
 Chebyshev integral
 Chebyshev iteration
 Chebyshev method
 Chebyshev nodes
 Chebyshev polynomials and the "Chebyshev form"
Chebyshev norm
Discrete Chebyshev polynomials
Discrete Chebyshev transform
 Chebyshev rational functions
Chebyshev–Gauss quadrature
 Chebyshev–Markov–Stieltjes inequalities
 Chebyshev's bias
 Chebyshev's inequality in probability and statistics
Chebyshev–Cantelli inequality
Multidimensional Chebyshev's inequality
Chebyshev pseudospectral method
 Chebyshev space
 Chebyshev's sum inequality
 Chebyshev's theorem (disambiguation)

Mechanics
 Chebyshev's Lambda Mechanism
 Chebyshev linkage, a straight line generating linkage
 Chebychev–Grübler–Kutzbach criterion for the mobility analysis of linkages
 Roberts–Chebyshev theorem on the generation of cognate coupler-curves.

Other
Chebyshev (crater) 
2010 Chebyshev, asteroid

Chebyshev